Brimley is a surname. Notable people with the surname include:

 Clement Samuel Brimley (1863–1946), American zoologist
 Herbert Hutchinson Brimley (1861–1946), American zoologist
 Wilford Brimley (1934–2020), American actor

See also 
 Brimley Halt railway station, railway station that served the village of Brimley, South Devon, England
 Brimley Road, a north–south street in Toronto, Ontario, Canada
 Brimley, Michigan

 Brimley, a residential village within Teignbridge, Devon